The British Journal of Psychology is a quarterly peer-reviewed psychology journal. It was established in 1904 and is published by Wiley-Blackwell on behalf of the British Psychological Society. The editor-in-chief is Stefan R. Schweinberger (University of Jena). According to the Journal Citation Reports, the journal has a 2018 impact factor of 3.308, ranking it 20th out of 137 journals in the category "Psychology, Multidisciplinary".

References

External links

Psychology journals
British Psychological Society academic journals
Publications established in 1904
Quarterly journals
English-language journals
Wiley-Blackwell academic journals